Dictyla echii is a species of lace bug in the family Tingidae. It is found in Africa, Europe and Northern Asia (excluding China), North America, and Southern Asia.

Subspecies
These three subspecies belong to the species Dictyla echii:
 Dictyla echii echii (Schrank, 1782) i g
 Dictyla echii nigricans (Hoberlandt, 1943) i c g
 Dictyla echii rufina (Seidenstücker, 1954) i c g
Data sources: i = ITIS, c = Catalogue of Life, g = GBIF, b = Bugguide.net

References

Further reading

External links

 

Tingidae
Insects described in 1782